The 2015 Summit League men's basketball tournament was the post-season men's basketball tournament for the Summit League. The 2015 tournament took place March 7–10 at the Denny Sanford Premier Center in Sioux Falls, South Dakota for the first time after previously being played at Sioux Falls Arena. With Oral Roberts rejoining the league, the tournament went back to eight teams. The tournament champion received an automatic bid to the 2015 NCAA tournament.

Bracket

Awards and honors
Source: 
Tournament MVP: Lawrence Alexander – North Dakota State

All-Tournament Team:

 Lawrence Alexander – North Dakota State
 Obi Emegano – Oral Roberts
 A.J. Jacobson – North Dakota State
 Cody Larson – South Dakota State
 Deondre Parks – South Dakota State

References

Tournament
Summit League men's basketball tournament
The Summit League men's basketball tournament
Basketball competitions in Sioux Falls, South Dakota
College basketball tournaments in South Dakota